Czarna Kopa (Czech Svorová hora, 1407 m a.s.l.) is a mountain peak situated in the eastern part of Karkonosze on Polish and Czech border within the Karkonosze National Park on the Polish–Czech Friendship Trail. The peak area is exposed and windy.

Situation 
In the main range the very distinct peak is situated between Śnieżka and Okraj. The summit is entirely on the Czech side.

References 

Mountains of Poland
Mountains and hills of the Czech Republic
Czech Republic–Poland border
International mountains of Europe